Sir Christopher Patrick Thomas Farrelly  (born ) is a New Zealand community leader and health administrator. He was the Auckland City Missioner from 2016 until 2021.

Honours

In the 2022 New Year Honours, Farrelly was appointed a Knight Companion of the New Zealand Order of Merit, for services to health and the community.

References

1950s births
Living people
Knights Companion of the New Zealand Order of Merit
New Zealand community activists
People from Te Puke
New Zealand healthcare managers